5 de Septiembre is a Cuban newspaper which is controlled by the state. It is published in Spanish, with online English, Portuguese and French pages. The newspaper was launched on 5 September 1980 and is located in Cienfuegos.

References

External links 
 5 de Septiembre online 

1980 establishments in Cuba
Mass media in Cienfuegos
Newspapers published in Cuba
Newspapers established in 1980
Spanish-language newspapers